Steen Hildebrandt (born in 1944) is a Danish academic and author on business, organizational theory and management. He is Professor Emeritus of Management Studies at Aarhus School of Business, University of Aarhus and an associated professor at Copenhagen Business School.

Other pursuits
In 2004 he founded the con sultency Hildebrandt & Brandi in collaboration with Søren Brandi. He was chairman of Sankt Lukas Stiftelsen in 2007–2008.

Personal life
Hildebrandt is married and lives in the Frederiksberg district of Copenahgen. He has two grown-up children.

Bibliography in English

 1998 	The learning organisations: Experiences from Danish enterprises. (with Søren Brandi) Original title in Danish: Lærende organisationer. Erfaringer fra danske virksomheder.
 2001 	Gold through competence. (Steen Hildebrandt and Søren Brandi (ed.) Original title in Danish: Kompetenceguldet.
 2003 	Management by use of diversity. (with Søren Brandi) Original title in Danish: Mangfoldighedsledelse.
 2005 	Managing the changes. (with Søren Brandi) Original title in Danish: Ledelse af forandring.

References

External links
 Steen Hildebrandts own website

1944 births
Living people
Danish business theorists
Danish social scientists
Business educators